Kathiraon is a village in Pindra Tehsil of Varanasi district in the Indian state of Uttar Pradesh. Kathiraon has its own gram panchayat in the same name as the village.

Demography
Kathiraon has a total population of 11,994 people amongst 1,823 families. The sex ratio of Kathiraon is 1,045 and child sex ratio is 910. The Uttar Pradesh state average for both ratios is 912 and 902 respectively.

Transportation
Kathiraon can be accessed by road and does not have a railway station of its own.

See also

Notes
  All demographic data is based on 2011 Census of India.

References 

Villages in Varanasi district